Ougrée is a town of Wallonia and a district of the municipality of Seraing, located in the province of Liège, Belgium. 

It was a separate municipality before the merging of municipalities in 1977. Olympic swimmers Béatrice Mottoulle and Chantal Grimard were both born here. Belgian football goalkeeper Michel Preud'Homme was also born here as well as writer Franz Weyergans in 1912.

References

Sub-municipalities of Seraing
Former municipalities of Liège Province